A by-election was held for the British House of Commons constituency of Penistone on 13 July 1978.  The seat had become vacant on the death of the Labour Member of Parliament John Mendelson, who had held the seat since a by-election in 1959.

The result was a hold for the Labour Party.

See also
Penistone constituency
1921 Penistone by-election
1959 Penistone by-election
Penistone
Lists of United Kingdom by-elections

References

By-elections to the Parliament of the United Kingdom in South Yorkshire constituencies
1978 elections in the United Kingdom
1978 in England
Politics of Penistone
Elections in Barnsley
1970s in South Yorkshire
July 1978 events in Europe